Boechera perennans is a species of rockcress known as perennial rockcress. It is native to the southwestern United States and northern Mexico. This rockcress forms several erect stems reaching past half a meter in height at maximum. The basal leaves may be several centimeters long and are hairy and often toothed, while the scattered upper leaves are smaller. Toward the top of the stem are small widely spaced purple or pink-purple flowers on long, thin stalks. These give way to the fruits, which are siliques: long, very narrow pods up to 6 centimeters long.

External links

Jepson Manual Treatment
USDA Plants Profile
Photo gallery

perennans
Flora of North America